Marios Antoniades (born 14 May 1990) is a Cypriot professional footballer who plays for Cypriot First Division club, Anorthosis Famagusta. He primarily plays as a left-back and more recently as a centre-back.

Early life
Antoniades was born in Nicosia.

Career

APOEL
Antoniades is a product of APOEL Academies. He made his official debut with APOEL on 10 May 2008, playing the full 90 minutes in a 2007–08 Cypriot First Division match against Anorthosis. He added a further four appearances in the season's domestic Cup and another one appearance two years later in the 2009–10 Cypriot Cup. His second league appearance came on 7 May 2011, coming on as a substitute in a 2010–11 Cypriot First Division match against AEK Larnaca.

In the 2012–13 season, Antoniades appeared in six league matches and at the end he became a champion after winning the Cypriot First Division with APOEL. He made his debut in European competitions on 12 December 2013, playing 64 minutes in APOEL's 2–0 defeat at Eintracht Frankfurt for the last matchday of the UEFA Europa League group stage. On 26 April 2014, he scored his first official goal for APOEL, in his team's 1–2 home defeat against Ermis Aradippou for the Cypriot First Division. During the 2013–14 season, Antoniades achieved to win all the titles in Cyprus, the Cypriot League, the Cypriot Cup and the Cypriot Super Cup.

Antoniades made his UEFA Champions League debut in the 2014–15 season, appearing in five group stage matches in that season APOEL's campaign. In the 2014–15 season, he managed to add two more titles to his collection, as APOEL won again both the Cypriot championship and the cup. After he crowned 2015–16 Cypriot First Division champion for a fourth time in the row, he decided to leave APOEL as his contract with the club ended.

Panionios
On 1 July 2016, he signed a two-year contract with Greek Superleague side Panionios.

AEK Larnaca
On 13 June 2017, he signed a two-year contract with Greek Cypriot League side AEK Larnaca. He made his official debut with AEK on 29 June 2017, playing the full 90 minutes in a 2017–18 UEFA Europa League match against Lincoln.

Loan to Apollon Limassol
On 28 August 2019, Antoniades joined Apollon Limassol on loan until the end of the season. He played with Apollon Limassol for 7 games.

Anorthosis Famagusta
On 21 June 2021, it was announced that Antoniades had signed for Anorthosis Famagusta until June 2023. He made his debut with the team on 13 July 2021, playing the full 90 minutes in a Cypriot Super Cup match against Omonoia.

International career
On 10 October 2012, Antoniades was called for the first time into the Cyprus national team for the 2014 FIFA World Cup qualification matches against Slovenia and Norway, but he remained on the bench in both matches. He made his debut for the national team on 14 November 2012, in a friendly match against Finland at GSP Stadium, coming on as an 87th-minute substitute in Cyprus' 0–3 defeat.

Honours
 APOEL
Cypriot First Division: 2008–09, 2010–11, 2012–13, 2013–14, 2014–15, 2015–16
Cypriot Cup: 2007–08, 2013–14, 2014–15
Cypriot Super Cup: 2008, 2009, 2011, 2013

 AEK Larnaca
Cypriot Cup: 2017–18

References

External links
 AEK Larnaca official profile
 
 

1990 births
Living people
Greek Cypriot people
Sportspeople from Nicosia
Cypriot footballers
Association football defenders
APOEL FC players
Panionios F.C. players
AEK Larnaca FC players
Cypriot First Division players
Super League Greece players
Cyprus international footballers
Cypriot expatriate footballers
Cypriot expatriate sportspeople in Greece
Expatriate footballers in Greece